A by-election was held for the New South Wales Legislative Assembly electorate of Lower Hunter on 19 July 1861 because of the resignation of Alexander Scott to accept an appointment to the Legislative Council.

Dates

Polling places

Result

Alexander Scott resigned to be appointed to the Legislative Council.

See also
Electoral results for the district of Lower Hunter
List of New South Wales state by-elections

References

1861 elections in Australia
New South Wales state by-elections
1860s in New South Wales